Haunted Ranch is a 1943 American Western film directed by Robert Emmett Tansey. The film is the twentieth in Monogram Pictures' "Range Busters" series, and it stars John "Dusty" King as Dusty, "Davy" Sharpe and Max "Alibi" Terhune, with Rex Lease, Julie Duncan and Glenn Strange.

Cast
John "Dusty" King as "Dusty" King
Dave Sharpe as Davy Sharpe
Max Terhune as "Alibi" Terhune
Elmer as Elmer - Alibi's Dummy
Julie Duncan as Helen Weston
Glenn Strange as Rance Austin
Charles King as Henchman Chuck
Bud Osborne as Henchman Ed
Rex Lease as Deputy Rex Lease
Fred "Snowflake" Toones as Sam
Budd Buster as Sheriff
Tex Palmer as Henchman Danny
Steve Clark as Marshal Hammond

Soundtrack
 John "Dusty" King - "Where the Prairie Hills Meet the Sky" (Words and Music by John "Dusty" King as John King)

See also
The Range Busters series:
 The Range Busters (1940)
 Trailing Double Trouble (1940)
 West of Pinto Basin (1940)
 Trail of the Silver Spurs (1941)
 The Kid's Last Ride (1941)
 Tumbledown Ranch in Arizona (1941)
 Wrangler's Roost (1941)
 Fugitive Valley (1941)
 Saddle Mountain Roundup (1941)
 Tonto Basin Outlaws (1941)
 Underground Rustlers (1941)
 Thunder River Feud (1942)
 Rock River Renegades (1942)
 Boot Hill Bandits (1942)
 Texas Trouble Shooters (1942)
 Arizona Stage Coach (1942)
 Texas to Bataan (1942)
 Trail Riders (1942)
 Two Fisted Justice (1943)
 Haunted Ranch (1943)
 Land of Hunted Men (1943)
 Cowboy Commandos (1943)
 Black Market Rustlers (1943)
 Bullets and Saddles (1943)

External links

1943 films
1940s English-language films
American black-and-white films
American mystery films
1943 Western (genre) films
Monogram Pictures films
American Western (genre) films
Range Busters
Films directed by Robert Emmett Tansey
1940s American films